Eoconus derelictus is an extinct species of predatory sea snail, a marine gastropod mollusk, in the family Conidae.

Description
The length of the shell attains 55 mm

Distribution
Fossils of this species were found in Paris Basin, northwest France, and were dated back to the late Lutetian period.

References

 Tracey S., Craig B., Belliard L. & Gain O. (2017). One, four or forty species? - early Conidae (Mollusca, Gastropoda) that led to a radiation and biodiversity peak in the late Lutetian Eocene of the Cotentin, NW France. Carnets de Voyages Paléontologiques dans le Bassin Anglo-Parisien. 3: 1-38

External links
 Worldwide Mollusc Species Data Base: Lithoconus derelictus

derelictus
Gastropods described in 1865